Hinch is an unincorporated community in eastern Crawford County, in the U.S. state of Missouri.

The community is on Hinch Branch, a small tributary of the Meramec River. Onondaga Cave State Park is 3.5 miles to the west and the community of Vilander is 2.5 miles to the northeast.

History
A post office called Hinch was established in 1896, and remained in operation until 1954. The community was named after William Hinch, an early settler.

References

Unincorporated communities in Crawford County, Missouri
Unincorporated communities in Missouri